Angul Stadium is a cricket ground in Angul, Odisha. The ground was established in 1999 and is owned by Angul District Sports Association. The ground has been constructed with support from National Aluminum Company Ltd and Sports Department, Government of Orissa. The stadium has a capacity of 2,000 people with a pavilion which includes a VIP gallery and club house.

The stadium has hosted a first-class matches when Orissa cricket team and Assam cricket team as the match was drawn in 1999. The stadium has hosted a List A match also between Orissa cricket team and Assam cricket team as the match was drawn in 1999.

Facilities 
 Club house
 Cricket pitch
 Gallery
 Football ground
 400 meter track

References

External links 
 Wikimapia
 Cricketarchive
 Cricinfo

Cricket grounds in Odisha
Multi-purpose stadiums in India
Athletics (track and field) venues in India
Football venues in Odisha
Sports venues in Odisha
Sports venues completed in 1999
1999 establishments in Orissa
20th-century architecture in India